Running Riot may refer to:

Running Riot (film), South African film 2006
Running Riot, musical by Douglas Furber 1938
Running Riot, play by Derek Benfield 1953
Ein ausschweifender Mensch ("Running Riot", 1929) novel by Hermann Kesten
Runnin' Riot (band), Belfast punk band named after the Cock Sparrer song
"Running Riot", single by Cock Sparrer also from albums including Running Riot in '84 1984
"Running Riot", song by Iron Savior from Megatropolis 2007